Tenberry Software (previously Rational Systems) was a software company notable for the development of DOS/16M and DOS/4G, which were the first industry standard DOS extenders.

See also 
 Phar Lap - competitor

References

External links
 Tenberry Software

Defunct software companies of the United States
Companies based in Phoenix, Arizona